Siggins is a surname. Notable people with the surname include:

Jack Siggins (1909–1995), Irish rugby union player
Maggie Siggins (born 1942), Canadian journalist and writer
Rose Siggins (1972–2015), American actress
Selina Siggins (1878–1964), Australian political activist